Tadayoshi Yokota (横田 忠義 Yokota Tadayoshi, born 26 September 1947) is a former volleyball player from Japan, who was a member of the Japan Men's National Team that won the gold medal at the 1972 Summer Olympics and the silver medal at the 1968 Summer Olympics.

References

National team
1968: 2nd place in the Olympic Games of Mexico City
1970: 3rd place in the World Championship
1972: 1st place in the Olympic Games of Munich
1974: 3rd place in the World Championship
1976: 4th place in the Olympic Games of Montreal

1947 births
Living people
Japanese men's volleyball players
Japanese volleyball coaches
Volleyball players at the 1968 Summer Olympics
Volleyball players at the 1972 Summer Olympics
Volleyball players at the 1976 Summer Olympics
Olympic volleyball players of Japan
Olympic gold medalists for Japan
Olympic silver medalists for Japan
Olympic medalists in volleyball
Sportspeople from Kagawa Prefecture
Asian Games medalists in volleyball
Volleyball players at the 1966 Asian Games
Volleyball players at the 1970 Asian Games
Volleyball players at the 1974 Asian Games
Medalists at the 1972 Summer Olympics
Medalists at the 1968 Summer Olympics
Medalists at the 1966 Asian Games
Medalists at the 1970 Asian Games
Medalists at the 1974 Asian Games
Asian Games gold medalists for Japan
People from Mitoyo, Kagawa